The Temple of Poseidon at Tainaron is on the extreme point of the Mani Peninsula, the middle finger of the Peloponnese peninsula. It was dedicated to Poseidon Asphaleios, meaning "Poseidon of Safety".

Strabo described the sanctuary as a sacred grove with a nearby cave. The geographer Pausanias wrote of a cave like temple with a statue to Poseidon at its entrance. In antiquity, the cave was thought to be the entrance to Hades. When Sparta was devastated by an earthquake in 464BC, it was said that the cause had been Poseidon's vengeance on the Spartan ephors after they had killed helots who had taken refuge at the sanctuary. It is thought that the sanctuary at Tainaron dates at least to a time when the helots were still independent, before they had been subjugated by Sparta.

The sanctuary may have been a place of refuge for slaves. Polybius mentions it as one of the asylum sanctuaries destroyed by the Aetolian Timaios around 240BC, and Plutarch mentions it among the asylum sanctuaries attacked by pirates in the 1st centuryBC. Four stelai have been found at Tainaron dating to the fourth and fifth centuryBC which record the release of slaves; scholars think stelai cuttings found at the north entrance of the cave were for these stelai. Scholars believe that the stelai and Tainaron's historical role as a recruiting base for mercenaries were connected to Poseidon's sanctuary. The official name of the god of the sanctuary attested by literature and inscriptions is "Poseidon at Tainaron".

See also
 List of Ancient Greek temples
 Architecture of Ancient Greece

References

Ancient Greek archaeological sites in Peloponnese (region)
Hades
Temples of Poseidon
Mani Peninsula